The Mystic Ark is an image described by Hugh of Saint Victor (ca. 1096–1141), but no copy exists and debate surrounds whether it ever physically existed.

References

External links
 http://mysticark.ucr.edu/ - a detailed collection of the same illustrations published in The Mystic Ark: Hugh of Saint Victor, Art, and Thought in the Twelfth Century.

12th-century manuscripts
12th-century paintings